The 2014 Richmond Raiders season was the fifth season as a professional indoor football franchise and their third in the Professional Indoor Football League (PIFL). One of 8 teams competing in the PIFL for the 2014 season.

Schedule
Key:

Regular season
All start times are local to home team

Roster

Division standings

References

External links
2014 results

Richmond Raiders
Richmond Raiders
Richmond Raiders